Francis Dreyfus (2 March 1940 in Le Raincy – 24 June 2010 in Neuilly-sur-Seine) was a French record producer, who focused on jazz and electronic music, publishing Jean-Michel Jarre's first commercially successful work, Oxygène.

In 1971, Dreyfus was the founder of the French record label, Disques Motors, and became the producer of Christophe. In 1985, he founded Disques Dreyfus. In 1991, Dreyfus also founded a jazz label called Dreyfus Jazz, whose artists have included Marcus Miller, Steve Grossman, Richard Galliano and Alan Stivell.

Dreyfus was born in Le Raincy, Seine-Saint-Denis department of France, the son of a Romanian-Jewish mother and an Alsatian-Jewish father. He was a relative of Captain Alfred Dreyfus. He was the father of  Laura, Chloe and actress Julie Dreyfus. He had the latter with Pascale Audret.

Francis Dreyfus died at the American Hospital of Paris in Neuilly-sur-Seine, a suburb of Paris, on 24 June 2010 at the age of 70.

References

External links

1940 births
2010 deaths
Musicians from Paris
French record producers
French people of Romanian descent
Jazz record producers